BCC may refer to:

Banks, currency, chambers of commerce
 Bitconnect, a kind of cryptocurrency 
 Bitcoin Cash, a kind of cryptocurrency (more common symbol is BCH)
 British Chambers of Commerce, a national network of accredited Chambers of Commerce across the UK
 Central Bank of the Comoros (Banque Centrale des Comores)
 Central Bank of the Congo (Banque Centrale du Congo)
 Central Bank of Cuba (Banco Central de Cuba)

Education
 Australia
 Ballarat and Clarendon College, a K–12 school in Ballarat, Victoria
 Brindabella Christian College, a Christian primary through senior college in Australian Capital Territory

 Bangladesh
 Barisal Cadet College, one of the Cadet Colleges of Bangladesh

 Barbados
 Barbados Community College

 Canada
 Barrie Central Collegiate Institute, a high school in Barrie, Ontario

 Philippines
 Bacolod Christian Center, a preschool in Bacolod, Negros Occidental

 Thailand
 Bangkok Christian College, a private school in Bangkok

 United Kingdom
 Bicester Community College, former name of The Bicester School, in Bicester, Oxfordshire, England

 United States – community colleges
 Bee County College, a community college in Beeville, Texas
 Bellevue Community College, a community college in Bellevue, Washington
 Bergen Community College, a community college in Bergen County, New Jersey
 Berkeley City College, a community college in Berkeley, California
 Berkshire Community College, a community college in Pittsfield, Massachusetts
 Brevard Community College, a community college in Brevard County, Florida
 Bristol Community College, a community college in Fall River, Massachusetts
 Bronx Community College, a community college in The Bronx, New York
 Brookdale Community College, a community college in Lincroft, Monmouth County, New Jersey
 Broome Community College, a two-year college in Broome County, New York
 Broward Community College, a community college in Broward County, Florida
 Brunswick Community College, a two-year college in Brunswick County, North Carolina
 Rowan College at Burlington County, a community college in Burlington County, New Jersey formerly named Burlington County College
 Butler Community College, a college in El Dorado, Kansas

 United States – other schools
 Baltimore City College, a public secondary school in Baltimore, Maryland
 Bay City Central High School, a high school in Bay City, Michigan
 Bethesda-Chevy Chase High School, a public school in Montgomery County, Maryland
 Bethune-Cookman College, the former name of Bethune-Cookman University, a historically black college in Daytona Beach, Florida

Government

 Bangalore City Corporation, the governing council for Bangalore
 Bankstown City Council
 Birmingham City Council
 Brisbane City Council, the governing council for Brisbane
 Buffalo Common Council, the legislative branch of the Buffalo, New York municipal government
 Boston City Council
 Bristol City Council, the governing body of Bristol, UK
 California Bureau of Cannabis Control, the state regulator
 Orange County Board of County Commissioners, the governing body of Orange County, Florida

Medicine, science, technology

Medicine
 Basal cell carcinoma, the most common skin cancer
 Burkholderia cepacia complex, a bacterial pathogen

Science and technology
 Behavior Change Communication
 Body-centered cubic, a form of atomic arrangement in a crystal lattice
 Borland C++, a C and C++ compiler used in C++Builder
 Bricx Command Center, an Integrated Development Environment for the Not eXactly C (NXC) language
 British Colour Council, a defunct industry standards organization
 Business Controls Corporation,  best known for its SB-5 Cobol application software generator

Places and facilities

 Baltimore Convention Center, in downtown Baltimore, Maryland, United States
 Batam City Condominium, a skyscraper in Batam, Indonesia
 Beccles railway station, in England (National Rail station code BCC)
 Beltsville Communications Center, former name of the Beltsville Messaging Center, a U.S. Department of State facility in Beltsville, Maryland
 Bessemer Civic Center, a performing arts and convention center in Bessemer, Alabama, United States
 Bosmal City Centar, a skyscraper and residential building in Sarajevo
 Bramalea City Centre, an indoor shopping mall in Brampton, Ontario, Canada
 Brickell City Centre, mixed-use development in Miami, Florida, United States
 Brunstad Conference Center, near Oslo, Norway

Politics 

 Blue Collar Caucus, an American Democratic Party caucus created in 2016
 Blue Collar Conservativism, A British Conservative Party created in 2019

Religion

 Beaver Creek Camp, a Salvation Army camp in Saskatchewan, Canada
 Beth Chayim Chadashim, a Jewish synagogue in Los Angeles, California
 Boston Church of Christ, a part of International Churches of Christ
 Botswana Council of Churches
 Bristol Community Church, a charismatic church in Kingswood, Bristol, England
 Brunstad Christian Church, a worldwide evangelical non-denominational Christian church
 Buddhist Cultural Centre, Sri Lanka
 By Common Consent, a prominent Mormon blog

Sports

 BCC Lions, a Nigerian football team
 Blackpool Combat Club, a professional wrestling stable in All Elite Wrestling

Telecommunications

 Blind carbon copy (Bcc:), the practice of sending an e-mail to multiple recipients without disclosing the complete list of recipients
 Block check character, a character added to a transmission block to facilitate error detection in telecommunications
 Broadcasting Corporation of China, a broadcasting company of the Republic of China (Taiwan)

Other
 Bamburi Cement, in Kenya
 BCC, an electrical retailer based in the Netherlands, owned by Kesa Electricals
 Bear Creek 3 Airport's  IATA airport code
 The Big Comfy Couch, a Canadian children's television series
 Birch Carroll & Coyle, an Australian chain of cinema multiplexes
 Black Country Communion, a rock supergroup
 Boise Cascade Corporation, an American pulp and paper company
 Boonville Correctional Center, a medium security state penitentiary in Missouri, United States
 Boot Camp Clik, a hip hop supergroup from Brooklyn, New York
 Border Crossing Card, a document that allows limited entry into the United States by visitors
 Brazilian Cultural Center, a mission within several Brazilian diplomatic posts.
 Breast Cancer Campaign, a UK-based breast cancer charity providing funding for medical research
 Breast Cancer Care, a UK-based breast cancer charity providing information and support
 British Carnatic Choir, a UK-based choir group
 The Bulletin of the Center for Children's Books, an academic journal in the United States